Colle del Melogno (1028 m) is a mountain pass in the Province of Savona in Italy. It is located on the main chain of the Alps and connects Ceva and Calizzano with Magliolo and Finale Ligure, on the coast of Ligurian Sea.

Hiking 
The pass is also accessible by off-road mountain paths and is crossed by the Alta Via dei Monti Liguri, a long-distance trail from Ventimiglia (province of Imperia) to Bolano (province of La Spezia).

See also
 List of highest paved roads in Europe
 List of mountain passes

References

Melogno
Melogno
Ceva